Pelargoderus vittatus is a species of beetle in the family Cerambycidae. It was described by Audinet-Serville in 1835. It is known from Moluccas.

References

vittatus
Beetles described in 1835